is a Japanese football player currently playing for Kamatamare Sanuki.

Club statistics
Updated to 23 February 2018.

References

External links
Profile at Kamatamare Sanuki

1985 births
Living people
Ritsumeikan University alumni
Association football people from Kyoto Prefecture
Japanese footballers
J1 League players
J2 League players
J3 League players
Shonan Bellmare players
Sagan Tosu players
Montedio Yamagata players
Thespakusatsu Gunma players
Kamatamare Sanuki players
Association football midfielders